As was the custom since 1930, the 1935 Tour de France was contested by national teams. Belgium, Italy, Spain, Germany and France each sent teams of 8 cyclists. Then there were the individuals: each country also sent four cyclists who rode as individuals, but could take over the place of another cyclists if they dropped out. Spain only sent three cyclists, and Swiss sent four individual cyclists even though they did not have a national team, so 23 individual cyclists were racing. Finally, there was the touriste-routiers category, in which 30 cyclists participated. In total this made 93 cyclists. Split up by nationality, there were 41 French, 13 Italian, 12 Belgian, 12 German, 11 Spanish and 4 Swiss cyclists.

The French team looked very strong, as it contained the three winners of the last five Tours, Antonin Magne, Georges Speicher and André Leducq, in addition to climber René Vietto and Maurice Archambaud, who had led the general classification for a long time in 1933. In addition, they had Roger Lapébie and Charles Pélissier riding as individuals, which meant that they could take the place of a French team member dropping out.

Of the other teams, the Belgian and Italian teams seemed most likely to challenge the French.

By team

By rider

By nationality

References

1935 Tour de France
1935